The 1936 United States presidential election in Pennsylvania took place on November 3, 1936 as part of the 1936 United States presidential election. Voters chose 36 representatives, or electors to the Electoral College, who voted for president and vice president.

Pennsylvania voted for the Democratic nominee, President Franklin D. Roosevelt, over the Republican nominee, Kansas Governor Alf Landon. Roosevelt was the first Democrat to win Pennsylvania since native son James Buchanan in 1856. Roosevelt won Pennsylvania by a large margin of 16.04%. His victory began the state's shift from a Republican stronghold to a swing state. Pennsylvania would thereafter back the winning candidate in all but four presidential elections (1948, 1968, 2000, and 2004).

, this was the only election since 1856 in which Lebanon County has voted for a Democratic presidential candidate. Roosevelt became the first Democrat since Franklin Pierce in 1852 to win Armstrong County and the first since 1856 to win Blair County, Dauphin County, and Philadelphia County

Results

Results by county

See also
 List of United States presidential elections in Pennsylvania

References

Pennsylvania
1936
1936 Pennsylvania elections